John W. Hallahan Catholic Girls' High School was an all-girls Roman Catholic high school located in Philadelphia, Pennsylvania, United States within the Archdiocese of Philadelphia. It is the country's first all-girls diocesan Catholic high school.

History
A Roman Catholic High School for Boys had been established in 1890 at Broad and Vine streets through the philanthropy of Thomas E. Cahill, a Philadelphia merchant-entrepreneur. This school was a positive development for education in the city, but unfortunately it was only benefiting the boys at the time. Girls had yet to have a Catholic School available.

“There is an urgent need for the establishment in the City of Philadelphia of a Catholic High School for girls,” stated Father John W. Shanahan as found in the First Annual Report of the Superintendent of Schools for the Archdiocese of Philadelphia for the year ending June 30, 1895.
In 1901, Father Philip R. McDevitt, who succeeded Father Shanahan, reported that High School Centres had been organized. There were five such Centres throughout the city. The religious community that served the parish school in which the Centres were located also staffed the High School Centre. There was, however, still the dream of a Catholic girls’ high school. Along with the dream, there was a prayer for a “Catholic Philanthropist:” to meet the necessity and to endow such a school.

The dream was realized in 1908, the centennial year of the diocese, when a devout Catholic lay woman, Mary E. H. McMichan, came forward to offer a gift of sufficient funds toward the establishment of such a school. The building's façade marks 1911 as the construction year. Since then, thousands of young women have attended.

From the beginning of the 20th century, Catholic Girls’ High School, the first Diocesan all-girls Catholic high school in the US, has welcomed “the daughters of the working-class families.” These girls have been given the advantages of a quality secondary education.

At the request of Mary McMichan, in 1925, the school’s name was prefaced with John W. Hallahan in honor of her brother.

Hallahan was granted permission in the mid-1930s to have Mickey Mouse, a registered Disney character, as a mascot. The tradition of jumping into the fountain at Logan Circle started in the 1970s and continues every year on the last day of the school year. The newly appointed Seniors, Juniors and Sophomores jump into the Swann Memorial Fountain and attract the local media in Philadelphia.

In December plans were announced to close Hallahan at the end of the 2020-2021 school year.

Curriculum 
The curriculum aims to prepare students to meet all future challenges.

Business Department The business and technology department offers several electives to the young ladies at Hallahan. The courses include: Technology Communication I&II, Personal Finance, Orientation to Healthcare, Accounting, Small Business Management/Entrepreneurship, Advanced Computer Explorations and Web Design and Publisher.
The business courses are often supplemented with guest speaks from the business community as well as field trips.

English Department Hallahan’s English department, headed by Megan McQuoid, currently provides students with 4 years of curriculum in 3 different course levels, including college predatory, honors and A.P. (advanced placement).
College Preparatory offerings include: English Language Arts I- reading, writing and speaking through Genre Studies, English Language Arts II – Critical Reading, Writing and speaking through World and British Studies, English Language Arts III - Critical Reading, Writing and speaking through American Studies, English Language Arts IV - Critical Reading, Writing and speaking through Contemporary American Studies.
Honors offerings include: a more vigorous and demanding offering of English Arts I and II.
A.P. (Advanced Placement) offerings include: AP English Language and AP English Literature

Fine Arts Department

Art - Jim Stella is the art teacher here at Hallahan. Hallahan’s Fine Arts department includes both music and art. Currently Hallahan offers Art I, Art II & Art III in addition to an Art Portfolio Class and Introduction to Computer Graphics Class which uses the Macintosh Computer lab.
Our Art program is further enhanced with opportunities outside the class room to further develop their artistic talent. These opportunities include a High School Cooperative Studio Program and the Moore College of Art Youth Artists Workshops. Additionally Hallahan is located near several places to view art including the Philadelphia Art Museum, and Rodin Museum, both within walking distance of the school.

Music- Hallahan currently offers 4 levels of music instruction. Music I, Music II, Music II, Music IV. No previous instrumental experience is necessary to participate in the music program at Hallahan. We are now offering a String Instrument program for those interested a string instrument such as the Viola, Violin, Cello, and Bass. Additionally Hallahan offers lessons in Woodwinds, and Percussions.

Math Department The Hallahan math department provides 3 different levels of coursework. This includes College Prep., Honors and A.P.
The Course Offerings are as follows:
College Prep: Algebra I, Geometry and Algebra II, students who opt to take math in their Senior year will have the option of Pre-Calculus/Trigonometry or Algebra III/ Trigonometry
Honors: Honors Algebra I, Honors Geometry, Honors Algebra II, students who opt to take math in their senior year will have the option of Pre-Calculus/ Trigonometry or Algebra III/ Trigonometry
Advanced Placement: A.P. Calculus, in order to be registered for this course you must have successfully passed the Pre-Calc course and have your Math teachers recommendation.

Science Department Hallahan has earned a lot of credit for its well developed Science program. The Science program offers 3 levels of coursework including College Prep, Honors and Advanced Placement. The Science program is very hands on experience which helps students better grasp the learning concepts. The science classes often have opportunities to explore exhibits at the Franklin Institute, which is right around the coroner.
College Prep offerings include: Physical Science, Biology, Chemistry, Anatomy and Physiology, Forensic Science, Environmental Science
Honors Offerings include: Honors Biology, Honors Chemistry, and Honors Physics
A.P. (Advanced Placement) offerings: A.P. Chemistry, A.P. Biology

Social Studies Hallahan requires three years of Social Studies where students cover World History. World History I covers the pre-human story from pre-history to the 16th century, and World History II tackles the 17th Century through to the 20th Century. Starting in grade 11 students can continue on with Social Studies by take Modern American History and Culture, Psychology or Government/Economics.

Theology Theology is a required course all 4 years at Hallahan. In 9th grade students explore “The revelation of Jesus Christ in Scripture” and “Who is Jesus Christ?” In 10th grade they move on to “Jesus Christ The Paschal Mystery” and “Jesus Christ’s Mission Continues”. In 11th grade they explore Catholic Morality, and in 12th grade they discuss the Church and Vocation.
All students participate in Mass. Some liturgies are held in school in the Gym, but often time the students are taken over the Cathedral for mass. In the junior year the Ring Mass is held there, and for Seniors mass for Graduation is held there.

World Languages At this time Hallahan offers four levels of Spanish to the students. Additionally freshmen honors students are given one year of Honors Latin and students of any year are offered Italian.

Notable alumnae
Kim Delaney, American actress
Kathleen Antonelli nee Kathleen "Kay" McNulty, computer programmer, one of the programmers of ENIAC
Kristen Thomas, American rugby sevens player

References

External links

Private school review website

Girls' schools in Pennsylvania
Roman Catholic secondary schools in Philadelphia
Educational institutions established in 1911
1911 establishments in Pennsylvania
Spring Garden, Philadelphia